NGC 262 (also known as Markarian 348) is a spiral galaxy in the cluster LGG 14. It is a Seyfert 2 spiral galaxy located 287 million light years away in the constellation Andromeda. It was discovered on September 17, 1885 by Lewis A. Swift.

Size
This galaxy has an apparent diameter of 1.1' of the Earth's sky. It holds approximately 15 trillion stars. [NGC 262] was tidally disturbed by the gravitational forces of smaller galaxies, which resulted in its large size.

NGC 262 is very unusual, since it is 10 times larger than a regular spiral galaxy of its type. 
According to Morris and Wannier, NGC 262 is surrounded by a huge cloud of neutral hydrogen that is probably caused by the tidal stripping of smaller galaxies. The cloud has an apparent mass of approximately 50 billion solar masses at a distance of 88 kiloparsecs (287,000 light-years) from the nucleus of NGC 262 and extending up to 300 kiloparsecs (1 million light-years) away. The cloud is spiral shaped with at least one arm, and possibly another one extending throughout the galaxy.

References

External links
 

Seyfert galaxies
Andromeda (constellation)
0262
348
Unbarred lenticular galaxies
18850917